Baxon Gopito (born 1 July 1992) is a Zimbabwean cricketer. He made his List A debut for Mountaineers in the 2017–18 Pro50 Championship on 28 May 2018. In December 2020, he was selected to play for the Mountaineers in the 2020–21 Logan Cup. He made his first-class debut on 18 March 2021, for Mountaineers, in the 2020–21 Logan Cup.

References

External links
 

1992 births
Living people
Zimbabwean cricketers
Place of birth missing (living people)
Mountaineers cricketers